Allan Michael Barker (born 23 February 1956) is an English former professional footballer.

A full back, he played for Newcastle United, Hartlepool United and Gillingham between 1973 and 1984.

References

1956 births
Living people
English footballers
Gillingham F.C. players
Newcastle United F.C. players
Hartlepool United F.C. players
Sportspeople from Bishop Auckland
Footballers from County Durham
Association football defenders